Balkavi Bairagi (born Nand Ramdas Bairagi; 10 February 1931 – 13 May 2018) popularly known Rastrakavi Balkavi Bairagi  was a Hindi poet, film lyricist and politician from India. His songs in Malvi, such as the very popular 'Panihari' (A woman carrying water) gave a stage to Malvi,a Hindi dialect spoken in the  region of Malva (Malwa) in the mainstream Hindi poetry scenario. He was one of the several who have been hailed as a Rashtrakavi ('national poet'). He was a Member of Parliament, Rajya Sabha from Madhya Pradesh from 1998 to 2004.

Early life and education
Bairagi was born in Manasa in a Vaishnav Brahmin (Bairagi) family. Originally named Nand Ramdas Bairagi, he came to be popularly called as "Balkavi" Bairagi as he wrote some classic poems during his childhood. He obtained his post-graduate degree in Hindi from Vikram University, Ujjain.

Literary career

Bairagi wrote several Hindi poems and wrote prolifically for children. His poem "Jhar gaye paat, bisar gayi tehni" is considered a masterpiece by Hindi poets. He wrote lyrics for at least a dozen Hindi films, the most noted among them being Reshma aur Shera and Ankahee.

Political career 
As a politician affiliated to the Indian National Congress, he was elected to the Madhya Pradesh Legislative Assembly from Manasa in 1968 and again in 1980. At various points in time, he served as the Minister of State for Information, the Minister of Language and Tourism and the Minister of Food and Civil Supplies in the Madhya Pradesh Government. He was a Member of the Lok Sabha between 1984 and 1989, representing the Mandsaur constituency. He was a Rajya Sabha member from 1998 to 2004.

Popular literary works

Representative poems 

 Jhar gaye paat, bisar gayi tehni
 Apni gandh nahi bechoonga
 Deewat par deep
 Jo kutilta se jiyenge
 Mere desh ke laal
 Naujawan aao re
 Saara desh hamaara

Poems for children 

 Vishwaas
 Chaand mein dhabba
 Chai banaao
 Aakaash
 Khud saagar ban jao
 Five poems for children-1
 Five poems for children- 2
 Five poems for children- 3

Filmography

Famous poems

झर गये पात,बिसर गई टहनी (The leaves have fallen, the branches have been forgotten)  
झर गये पात

बिसर गई टहनी

करुण कथा जग से क्या कहनी ?

नव कोंपल के आते-आते

टूट गये सब के सब नाते

राम करे इस नव पल्लव को

पड़े नहीं यह पीड़ा सहनी

झर गये पात

बिसर गई टहनी

करुण कथा जग से क्या कहनी ?

कहीं रंग है, कहीं राग है

कहीं चंग है, कहीं फ़ाग है

और धूसरित पात नाथ को

टुक-टुक देखे शाख विरहनी

झर गये पात

बिसर गई टहनी

करुण कथा जग से क्या कहनी ?

पवन पाश में पड़े पात ये

जनम-मरण में रहे साथ ये

"वृन्दावन" की श्लथ बाहों में

समा गई ऋतु की "मृगनयनी"

झर गये पात

बिसर गई टहनी

करुण कथा जग से क्या कहनी ?

Death and legacy 
He died in his sleep on 13 May 2018 at the age of 87 years. His legacy is continued by two sons and numerous grandchildren. He is remembered as one of the most popular and reputed poets of Hindi language.

References

1931 births
2018 deaths
Poets from Madhya Pradesh
People from Mandsaur district
Indian National Congress politicians from Madhya Pradesh
Rajya Sabha members from Madhya Pradesh